Bogus Springs, also known as Baugus Springs, was an unincorporated community in Cass County, Texas, about  from McLeod. The settlement was abandoned by 1986.

References

Unincorporated communities in Cass County, Texas
Unincorporated communities in Texas